Tephrochronology is a geochronological technique that uses discrete layers of tephra—volcanic ash from a single eruption—to create a chronological framework in which paleoenvironmental or archaeological records can be placed. Such an established event provides a "tephra horizon". The premise of the technique is that each volcanic event produces ash with a unique chemical "fingerprint" that allows the deposit to be identified across the area affected by fallout. Thus, once the volcanic event has been independently dated, the tephra horizon will act as time marker.

The main advantages of the technique are that the volcanic ash layers can be relatively easily identified in many sediments and that the tephra layers are deposited relatively instantaneously over a wide spatial area. This means they provide accurate temporal marker layers which can be used to verify or corroborate other dating techniques, linking sequences widely separated by location into a unified chronology that correlates climatic sequences and events.

Tephrochronology requires accurate geochemical fingerprinting (usually via an electron microprobe). An important recent advance is the use of LA-ICP-MS (i.e. laser ablation ICP-MS) to measure trace-element abundances in individual tephra shards. One problem in tephrochronology is that tephra chemistry can become altered over time, at least for basaltic tephras.

Early tephra horizons were identified with the Saksunarvatn tephra (Icelandic origin,  cal. ka BP), forming a horizon in the late Pre-Boreal of Northern Europe, the Vedde ash (also Icelandic in origin, c. 12.0 cal. ka BP) and the Laacher See tephra (in the Eifel volcanic field, c. 12.9 cal. ka BP). Major volcanoes which have been used in tephrochronological studies include Vesuvius, Hekla and Santorini. Minor volcanic events may also leave their fingerprint in the geological record: Hayes Volcano is responsible for a series of six major tephra layers in the Cook Inlet region of Alaska. Tephra horizons provide a synchronous check against which to correlate the palaeoclimatic reconstructions that are obtained from terrestrial records, like fossil pollen studies (palynology), from varves in lake sediments or from marine deposits and ice-core records, and to extend the limits of carbon-14 dating.

A pioneer in the use of tephra layers as marker horizons to establish chronology was Sigurdur Thorarinsson, who began by studying the layers he found in his native Iceland. Since the late 1990s, techniques developed by Chris S. M. Turney (QUB, Belfast; now University of Exeter) and others for extracting tephra horizons invisible to the naked eye ("cryptotephra") have revolutionised the application of tephrochronology. This technique relies upon the difference between the specific gravity of the microtephra shards and the host sediment matrix. It has led to the first discovery of the Vedde ash on the mainland of Britain, in Sweden, in the Netherlands, in the Swiss Lake Soppensee and in two sites on the Karelian Isthmus of Baltic Russia.
It has also revealed previously undetected ash layers, such as the Borrobol Tephra first discovered in northern Scotland, dated to c. 14.4 cal. ka BP, the microtephra horizons of equivalent geochemistry from southern Sweden, dated at 13,900 Cariaco varve yrs BP and from northwest Scotland, dated at 13.6 cal. ka BP.

Notes

Sources 
Alloway B.V., Larsen G., Lowe D.J., Shane P.A.R., Westgate J.A. (2007). "Tephrochronology", Encyclopedia of Quaternary Science (editor—Elias S.A.) 2869–2869 (Elsevier).

Þórarinsson S. (1970). "Tephrochronology in medieval Iceland", Scientific Methods in Medieval Archaeology (ed. R. Berger) 295–328 (Berkeley: University of California Press).

External links 
 USGS tephrochronology technique
 Tephra and Tephrochronology, The University of Edinburgh
 Antarctic Research Group
 TEPHROCHRONOLOGY AND HIGH-PRECISION ANALYSIS
 TephraBase
 International Arctic Workshop, 2004. Stefan Wastegård et al., "Towards a tephrochronology framework for the last glacial/interglacial transition in Scandinavia and the Faroe Islands": (Abstract)

Geochemistry
Geochronology
Incremental dating
Tephra